Aur Bhai Kya Chal Raha hai! (transl. Brother, what else is going on?) is an Indian Hindi sitcom that premiered on 30 March 2021 on &TV and is digitally available on ZEE5.
Produced by Amjad Hussain Sheikh of Shade Productions, the show feature Akansha Sharma as Sakina Mirza, Farhana Parveen as Shanti Mishra, Pawan Singh as Zafar Ali Mirza, and Ambarish Bobby as Ramesh Prasad Mishra. Aur Bhai Kya Chal Raha? Hai premiered on 30 March 2021, at 9:30 pm on &TV, airing every Monday to Friday.

Cast

Main
 Akansha Sharma as Sakeena Mirza
 Pawan Kumar Singh as Sakeena's husband Zafar Ali Mirza
 Farhana fatema as Shanti Mishra
 Ambarish Bobby as Shanti's husband
 Annu Awasthi as Bittoo Kapoor
 Sandeep Yadav (actor) as Pappu Pandey
 Abhishek Singh as Dr Kudey Lal
 Pankaj Soni as Brij Bihari Mishra
 Archana Shukla as Begum Noorjahan Mirza
 Mahmood Hashmi as Bachchan

References

Hindi language television sitcoms